István Hiller (born 7 May 1964) is a Hungarian politician and former chairman of the governing Hungarian Socialist Party between 16 October 2004 and 24 February 2007, succeeding László Kovács, succeeded by Ferenc Gyurcsány. A co-founder of his party, Hiller was Minister of National Cultural Heritage under the government of Ferenc Gyurcsány from 2003 to 2005 before being replaced by András Bozóki. He became Vice Chairman of the party in 2003. Hiller was the Minister of Education and Culture between 2006 and 2010. He was elected one of the deputy speakers of the National Assembly in May 2014. In 2016, Hiller was elected caucus chair of MSZP.

Education
He earned  a degree in history and latin from the Faculty of Humanities of the Eötvös Loránd University.
Hiller attended university in Budapest and Heidelberg, and carried out research at the University of Vienna in 1995 and 1997. He speaks German, Latin and Ancient Greek fluently, as well as Italian and English.

Personal life
Hiller is married and has two sons, Gábor (b. 1990) and Dávid (b. 1992). His wife is Julianna Farkas.

References

External links
https://web.archive.org/web/20060408170859/http://www.hiller.hu/

|-

1964 births
Living people
20th-century Hungarian historians
Hungarian Socialist Party politicians
Education ministers of Hungary
Culture ministers of Hungary
Members of the National Assembly of Hungary (2002–2006)
Members of the National Assembly of Hungary (2006–2010)
Members of the National Assembly of Hungary (2010–2014)
Members of the National Assembly of Hungary (2014–2018)
Members of the National Assembly of Hungary (2018–2022)
Members of the National Assembly of Hungary (2022–2026)
People from Sopron
Grand Crosses with Star and Sash of the Order of Merit of the Federal Republic of Germany
Members of the Bajnai Government